Stanchfield Creek is a stream in Isanti County, in the U.S. state of Minnesota.

History
Stanchfield Creek was named for Daniel Stanchfield, an explorer of the area and afterward state politician.

See also
List of rivers of Minnesota

References

Rivers of Isanti County, Minnesota
Rivers of Minnesota